Marling School is a grammar school with academy status for boys, with a co-educational Sixth Form located in Stroud, Gloucestershire, England. It is on the Cainscross Road, the main route out of Stroud towards the M5, and is situated next to the girls' grammar school, Stroud High School, with which it shares some facilities.

History 

Marling School is the oldest secondary school in Stroud, having been founded in 1887 by Sir Samuel Marling, a local cloth manufacturer and former Liberal Member of Parliament, along with Sir Francis Hyett and Mr S.S. Dickinson.

In 1882, Sir Samuel Marling offered £10,000 towards the building of the school, and the school also inherited a number of endowments from the Red Coat School which was founded in 1642 by Thomas Webb, the St Chloe School founded at Amberley by Nathaniel Cambridge in 1699, and the educational charities established in the 17th and 18th centuries by William Johns and Robert Aldridge.

The new school opened to fee-paying pupils, which included some boarding students, in 1889. In 1909, under a new scheme the school became a public secondary school. Its endowments, along with those of the Stroud School of Science and Art and the Stroud High School for girls, were placed under the administration of a body called the Stroud Educational Foundation.

The old school houses were built shortly after the school's foundation, designed by W. H. Seth-Smith.

In 1965, the school was amalgamated with the Stroud Technical School for Boys which had been founded on a neighbouring site in 1910. The Technical School buildings now form the Art and Drama departments.

The head teacher David Lock was dismissed for gross misconduct in 2007 after allegations of bullying.

Following the appointment of Dr Stuart Wilson as the new headteacher in 2010, Marling School converted to an academy in August 2011.

The left hand side of the school shield contains the Marling family crest while the right hand side relates to the marriage of Samuel Stephens Marling to Margaret Williams Cartwright of Devizes.

Facilities

Marling School has a programme of rebuilding and refurbishment to improve the learning environment.

Following a successful bid to the EFA, the school was awarded a grant of £3.5 million to build a new block, named 'West Block' (or ‘WB) that houses the Geography, Mathematics and Religious Education departments and a new dining hall overlooking the cricket pitch and pavilion. The Design and Technology block incorporates teaching rooms for food technology, graphical products, resistant materials and electronics. This building is shared with Stroud High School. The South Block (or ‘SB’) built in 2005 houses English, Foreign Languages and Computing Science. The old gymnasium has been refurbished and repurposed as a library and school archive.

In late 2019, old, derelict original school buildings were refurbished and the History department now occupies them, moving out of the South Block and making way for more English and Maths. These new refurbished buildings are called 'East Block'. The Science department is situated in three buildings, near East Block, one being shared with Stroud High School, and another, which was built later and is more modern.

A modern sixth form block serves the students of both the Marling School and Stroud High School. This was the building used by Downfield Sixth Form until the two schools split into having their own sixth forms.

A separate Sports Hall is used along Cainscross Road, where students attend PE and sport-related clubs. Its facilities include a large indoor hall, where basketball, volleyball, and other indoor games are played, and grass pitches where games such as Football and Rugby are played.

Notable alumni

 Peter Barnes - Dramatist
 Eugene Paul Bennett, VC - Soldier
 Mark Chappell - Writer
 Reginald Clarry - Member of Parliament
 Rory Cowlam - Vet and TV presenter
 Prof Philip Dee CBE FRS, Physicist
 Patric Dickinson - Genealogist and herald
 Professor Brian Gardiner, palaeontologist and zoologist.
 Giles Harrison - Physicist
 Peter Hennessy, Baron Hennessy of Nympsfield,  - Historian and political journalist
 Jack Lee - Film director
 Laurie Lee - Poet, Novelist and screenwriter
 Tim McInnerny - Actor
 Roderick Oliver Redman - Professor of Astrophysics and past President of the Royal Astronomical Society
 Christian Ribeiro - Footballer
 Carl Trueman - Theologian
 Colin Walker - Cellist

References

External links 
 School website
 School Virtual Learning Environment

Stroud
Grammar schools in Gloucestershire
Academies in Gloucestershire
1887 establishments in England
Educational institutions established in 1887